The Prior of Christ Church was the prior of Christ Church Cathedral Priory in Canterbury, attached to Canterbury Cathedral.

Context
Canterbury Cathedral began life as cathedral for its city, diocese and archdiocese, headed by the Archbishop of Canterbury and run by a Dean.  However, when the cathedral was re-formed as a monastic institution (known as Christ Church Priory) as well as a cathedral, a Prior was put in charge of the monastery (with the Archbishop effectively acting as abbot).  When in 1539 the monastery was dissolved and reverted to being solely a cathedral, the prior's duties reverted to a dean, the first of whom was Nicholas Wotton.

List

Henry 1080–1096
Ernulf 1096–1107
Conrad 1108–1126
Gosford 1126–1128
Elmer 1128–1137
Jeremy / Jeremiah 1137–1143
Walter Durdens 1143–1149
Walter Parvus 1149–1153
Wybert 1153–1167
Odo 1167–1175
Benedict 1175–1177
Harlewine 1177–1179
Alan 1179–1186
Honorius 1186–1189
Roger Norreis 1189–1190
Osbern/Osbert de Bristow 1190–1191
Geoffry (sic) 1191–1205
John de Chatham 1205-c.1218
Walter III c.1218–1222
John of Sittingbourne 1222–1244
Roger de Lee 1234–1244
Nicholas de Sandwich 1244-1258
Roger de St Elphege 1258–1263
William (or Adam) Chillenden 1264–1274
Thomas Ringmer(e) 1274–1284
Henry de Eastry 1285–1331
Richard Oxinden/Oxenden 1331–1338
Robert Hathbrand 1338–1370
Richard Gillingham 1370–1376
Stephen Mongeham 1376–1377
John Fynch 1377–1391
Thomas Chillenden 1391–1411
John Woodnesborough 1411–1428
William Molash 1428–1438
John Salisbury –1446
John Elham 1446–1449
Thomas Goldstone 1449–1468
John Oxney 1468–1471
William Petham 1471–1472
William Sellynge 1472–1495
Thomas Goldstone II 1495–1517
Thomas Goldwell 1517–1539

Sources
 Table of priors and deans at the west end of the south aisle of Canterbury Cathedral nave. See also reference.
 Victoria County History at British History Online

References